Door to Silence (Italian: Le porte del silenzio), also known as Door Into Silence, is a 1992 Italian horror film written and directed by Lucio Fulci and produced by Joe D'Amato. It stars John Savage. This was the last film directed by Fulci.

Plot 
New Orleans, Louisiana. While attending the funeral of his father, Melvin Devereux (John Savage) meets a beautiful young woman (Sandi Schultz) who addresses him by name, although he cannot remember having met her before. Devereux drives away after an enigmatic exchange of casual words, motoring aimlessly around New Orleans. Devereux decides to ignore warning barriers and drives onto a closed freeway. But the police follow him, and he is forced to turn aside. His car breaks down in a dilapidated area of the city. But the mysterious young woman again appears, driving a red sports car. The mystery woman suggests that he try a mechanic located nearby to fix his car. After helping Devereux push his car to the garage, the young woman again refuses to explain how she knows him or tell him her name. While waiting, the woman suggests they go to a motel nearby, apparently for sex. After checking into a room, and getting ready in the bathroom, Devereux exits and discovers that she is gone, leaving behind a message written on a mirror in red lipstick which says that the time is not yet right.

Having collected his repaired vehicle, Devereux encounters a hearse driving on the road ahead. When he attempts to overtake it, the driver (Richard Castleman) deliberately swerves to prevent him. Turning off onto more treacherous country roads, Devereux nearly gets stranded when his car gets stuck in muddy terrain, and he barely negotiates a rickety wooden bridge.

At last finding his way back to the main road, he stops off at a local roadside bar for a drink where the hearse is also parked outside. In a drunken altercation, Devereux challenges the driver to reveal whose body he is transporting. The folded ribbon adorning the casket seen inside the hearse bears a name tantalizingly similar to Devereux's own. The confused, now frightened man follows the hearse to a church where an all-black congregation is mourning at another funeral procession.  Devereux drunkenly disrupts the proceedings, attempting to look inside the closed casket. He gets thrown out of the church by the angry parishioners.

Devereux drives over to a nearby funeral home where he sees that all of the corpses in the open coffins are labeled 'Melvin Devereux'. He finds his doppelganger lying dead in one of the caskets and tries to touch it, but it disappears beneath his outreached hand.

Back on the road, Devereux picks up a beautiful female hitchhiker, and tries to respond to her seductive advances, but he cannot perform, forcing her to leave the car. Next, Devereux drives onto a river barge as it transports a handful of vehicles, including the omnipresent hearse, to the other side of the river. Devereux rips open the hearse's back door and tries to open the coffin which clearly bears his name. The hearse driver intervenes and there is a struggle. Devereux is subdued by the other barge passengers and gets arrested. In a local courtroom, Devereux is given a fine for defiling the casket. Devereux drives away and soon stops to visit a tarot reader. Reading the palm of his right hand, the palmist tells him that he has been dead for several hours. She suddenly falls dead after receiving a phone call from a "Mr. Devereux."

Devereux is once more on the road, driving nowhere. He suddenly sees the hearse again on the road and tries to overtake it, only to crash head-on into an oncoming truck. Devereux is killed instantly. His wristwatch stops at 7:29 PM, the same time as the film's prologue where a briefly seen car crash had appeared to be the cause of his father's death. The mysterious woman observes the fatal accident a short distance away on the road before getting into her car and driving off. The number license place on the woman's car reads: D.E.A.T.H.

At the end of the final scene, the text of a mysterious quote in Italian appears: ... Quando varcherai le porte del nulla, nessuno ti sara vicino: solo l'ombra della tua morte ... IV Libro dell'Apocalisse. English translation: ... When you go to the gates of nothingness, no one will be near you: only the shadow of your death ... Book Four of the Apocalypse. To date, it is not known who the author of this quote is, nor has any anonymous source been located.

Cast 
 John Savage as Melvin Dovereux
 Sandi Schultz as The mysterious woman
 Richard Castleman
 Jennifer Loeb as Margie
 Elizabeth Chugden as Melvnin's wife, Sylvia
 Joe Cool Davis as minister
 Bob Shreves as the judge
 Mary Coulson as Melvin's Aunt Martha
 Fred Lewis as the bartender
 Maureen Rocquin as Juke box girl
 Dunca Boyer as the Cajun hunter

Production

Following the completion of Voices from Beyond, Lucio Fulci was approached by Aristide Massaccesi who read the short story "Porte del nulla" Fulci wrote, and suggested to adapt the story into Door to Silence. Fulci recalled that Massaccesi encouraged him to go to New Orleans and to bring his daughter with him to assist on the film and save money on production. Fulci recalled that on arrival, none of his equipment worked.

The film was shot on location in Madisonville, Louisiana over an 8-week period in April and May 1991.

Release
It was released on video to Spanish-speaking countries as El enigma de la muerte.

Reception 
Allmovie opined that the film lacks "both the energy and invention of [Fulci's] more familiar work."

In a 1998 interview, Joe D'Amato claimed this to be "the best movie I ever produced".

References

Sources

External links 
 
 

1992 films
1990s Italian films
Films directed by Lucio Fulci
Italian horror films
1990s Italian-language films
Films set in the United States
Films shot in Louisiana